Hendahewage Sanjeewa Gayan Sameera Silva (born 14 January 1974), known as Gayan Silva, is a former Sri Lankan-born international cricketer who represented the United Arab Emirates national team. A left-handed batsman and wicket keeper, and very occasional right-arm medium-fast bowler, Silva played club cricket for the local Police Sports Club and particularly Singha Sports Club. He has scored over 3,200 first class runs, but has not yet scored higher than 95, and has also played a handful of one day games, including matches against Scotland.

Early life

Silva war born in January 1974, in Balapitiya.

Career

First class cricket
Silva made his debut in 1993 for Singha Sports Club, playing Moors Sports Club on 8 January. He would go on to play 74 matches for Singha Sports Club, averaging 21.41, scoring 2,656 runs with a best of 95. On 11 January 2007, Silva played a first class match for UAE against Scotland, scoring 60 in a 140 run partnership with Saqib Ali. He then scored a second half-century, reaching 87. The match, however, ended in a draw. On 8 November 2007, UAE faced Bermuda, opening the batting and scoring 17 and four. Forming two solid opening partnerships, however UAE suffered batting collapses after his wicket was lost in both innings.

One day cricket

Silva played his first one-day match in 1998, facing the Moors Sports Club on 3 December. He opened the batting and made 46. Silva played a total of six matches for the Police Sports Club, the Singha Sports Club and the UAE respectively, averaging 3.50, 22.00 and 25.40 respectively.

Notes

1974 births
Emirati cricketers
United Arab Emirates One Day International cricketers
Living people
People from Southern Province, Sri Lanka
Sri Lankan emigrants to the United Arab Emirates
Sri Lankan expatriate sportspeople in the United Arab Emirates
Ruhuna cricketers